The 2010–11 Long Beach State 49ers men's basketball team represented California State University, Long Beach in the 2010–11 NCAA Division I men's basketball season. The 49ers, led by head coach Dan Monson, played their home games at Walter Pyramid in Long Beach, California, as members of the Big West Conference. The 49ers won the Big West regular season title by 4 games, and advanced to the championship game of the Big West tournament. In the title game, Long Beach State was upset by fifth-seeded UC Santa Barbara.

Long Beach State failed to qualify for the NCAA tournament, but received an automatic bid to the 2011 NIT as the regular-season champions of the Big West Conference. The 49ers were eliminated in the first round of the NIT by Washington State, 85–74.

Roster 

Source

Schedule and results

|-
!colspan=9 style=|Regular season

|-
!colspan=9 style=| Big West tournament

|-
!colspan=9 style=| NIT

Source

References

Long Beach State Beach men's basketball seasons
Long Beach State
Long Beach State
Long Beach State men's basketball
Long Beach State men's basketball